The Eucerini (often called long-horned bees) are the most diverse tribe in the family Apidae, with over 32 genera worldwide that were previously classified as members of the family Anthophoridae. All species are solitary, though many nest in large aggregations, and large "sleeping" aggregations of males are found occasionally. Most genera are distinctive in the unusually long male antennae from which the tribe derives its name (eucer- means true horned). They are most diverse in the Western Hemisphere.

Classification
The classification within the tribe is rather chaotic, as many of the genera are small and poorly characterized, with the bulk of species (about 500) in only five genera. This is a group in serious need of a thorough taxonomic overhaul, and the fusion of many genera would likely result (a revision in 2000 eliminated seven genera, another in 2018 eliminated six more).

Genera
 Agapanthinus LaBerge, 1957    
 Alloscirtetica Holmberg, 1909    
 Canephorula Jörgensen, 1909    
 Cemolobus Robertson, 1902 (recently moved into Eucera)
 Cubitalia Friese, 1911    
 Eucera Scopoli, 1770   
 Eucerinoda Michener & Moure, 1957    
 Florilegus Robertson, 1900    
 Gaesischia Michener, LaBerge & Moure, 1955   
 Gaesochira Moure & Michener, 1955    
 Hamatothrix Urban, 1989    
 Lophothygater Moure & Michener, 1955    
 Martinapis Cockerell, 1929    
 Melissodes Latreille, 1829    
 Melissoptila Holmberg, 1884    
 Micronychapis Moure & Michener, 1955    
 Mirnapis
 Notolonia Popov, 1962    
 Pachysvastra Moure & Michener, 1955    
 Peponapis Robertson, 1902 (recently moved into Eucera)
 Platysvastra Moure, 1967    
 Santiago Urban, 1989    
 Simanthedon Zavortink, 1975    
 Svastra Holmberg, 1884    
 Svastrides Michener, LaBerge & Moure, 1955 
 Svastrina Moure & Michener, 1955    
 Syntrichalonia LaBerge, 1957 (recently moved into Eucera)
 Tetralonia Spinola, 1839 (recently moved into Eucera)
 Tetraloniella Ashmead, 1899    
 Thygater Holmberg, 1884    
 Trichocerapis Cockerell, 1904    
 Ulugombakia
 Xenoglossa Smith, 1854 (recently moved into Eucera)

References

C. D. Michener (2000) The Bees of the World, Johns Hopkins University Press.

External links

Apinae
Bee tribes